Pythium rostratum is a plant pathogen infecting strawberries, fuchsias, and citruses.

References

Water mould plant pathogens and diseases
Citrus diseases
Ornamental plant pathogens and diseases
rostratum
Species described in 1907